Morgan's Last Raid is a lost 1929 American silent Western film directed by Nick Grinde and written by Harry Braxton and Bradley King. The film stars Tim McCoy, Dorothy Sebastian, Wheeler Oakman, Al Ernest Garcia and Hank Mann. The film was released on January 5, 1929, by Metro-Goldwyn-Mayer.

Cast 
 Tim McCoy as Capt. Daniel Clairbourne
 Dorothy Sebastian as Judith Rogers
 Wheeler Oakman as John Bland
 Al Ernest Garcia as Morgan
 Hank Mann as Tex
 C. Montague Shaw as Gen. Rogers

References

External links 
 

1929 films
1920s English-language films
1929 Western (genre) films
Metro-Goldwyn-Mayer films
Films directed by Nick Grinde
American Civil War films
American black-and-white films
Lost American films
Lost Western (genre) films
1929 lost films
Silent American Western (genre) films
1920s American films